Love You Loktantra is an Indian Hindi language film, directed by Abhay Nihalani and Prasanta Sahoo, written by Sanjay Chhel. The film stars debutantes Krishna Abhishek, Ali Asgar, Sapna Choudhary, Manoj Joshi, Ridoanul Haque Siyam, Ravi Kishan, Isha Koppikar, Ameet Kumar, Rohit Singh Matru, Sudhir Pandey and Sneha Ullal.

Soundtrack
The music of this film is composed by Lalit Pandit. Lyrics are penned by Sanjay Chhel and Gurunath Pandit.

Plot 
This film is political Satire narrated in a tongue-in-cheek manner, commenting on current Indian politics with a little touch of north Indian dilect with comedy humor but realistic mad comedy. It's a professional triangle between Female Chief Minister (CM), One Male Lawyer and a Female Lawyer hovering around Government Formation. Two kidnapped Independent MLA's hold key to Government Formation but are kidnapped overnight. Lawyers and Journalists rule the movie with their strategies and plans to form Govt.

Cast 
 Krishna Abhishek
 Ali Asgar
 Sapna Choudhary
 Manoj Joshi
 Ridoanul Haque Siyam
 Ravi Kishan
 Isha Koppikar
 Ameet Kumar
 Rohit Singh Matru
 Sudhir Pandey
 Sneha Ullal

References

External links
 

2020s Hindi-language films